Czesław Jakołcewicz (born 18 August 1961) is a Polish football manager and former player. He managed many teams throughout Poland and played for the Poland national team.

References

1961 births
Living people
Polish footballers
Association football defenders
Stal Szczecin players
Lech Poznań players
Fenerbahçe S.K. footballers
Odense Boldklub players
Warta Poznań players
Chrobry Głogów players
Ekstraklasa players
I liga players
Süper Lig players
Danish Superliga players
Poland international footballers
Polish expatriate footballers
Expatriate footballers in Turkey
Polish expatriate sportspeople in Turkey
Expatriate men's footballers in Denmark
Polish expatriate sportspeople in Denmark
Polish football managers
Lech Poznań managers
Wisła Płock managers
Warta Poznań managers
Ekstraklasa managers
I liga managers
People from Gryfino County